Osman Yaşar is Empire Innovation Professor at the Computational Science (CPS) department at State University of New York (SUNY) College at Brockport. He holds 3 master's degrees (physics, nuclear engineering, computer sciences) and a Ph.D. degree (engineering physics). His area of interest is supercomputing applications, computational fluid and particle dynamics, engine combustion modeling, parallel computing, plasma and radiation hydrodynamics, and adaptive mesh refinement. He established the first undergraduate program in computational science in the United States. He also established computational approach to math, science, and technology (C-MST) as a pedagogy at K-12 level. Dr. Yaşar testified before U.S. Congress about his efforts in improving math and science education.

He works closely with the industry, including General Motors, Chrysler, Cummins Engine, Intel, and Lockheed Martin. He served as the President of the Intel Supercomputer Users Group. He made important contributions in the field of science, engineering, and education. As a plasma physicist, he tackled the field of ignition in the combustion (mechanical engineering) community with more accurate models and as a computer scientist he developed algorithms to run record-breaking simulations on particle and fluid systems on supercomputers. Dr. Yaşar has more than 70 publications, developed more than 12 industrial codes, and served as Guest Editor for a number of Special Issues in his field.

Notes

References
C. D. Swanson, Computational Science Education Survey, Krell Institute
O. Yaşar, L. Little, R. Tuzun, K. Rajasethupathy, J. Maliekal, and M. Tahar, “Computational Math, Science, and Technology: A Strategy to Improve STEM Workforce and Pedagogy to Improve Math and Science Education,” Lecture Notes in Computer Science, Vol. 3992 (2006), pp. 169–176.
O. Yaşar, J. Maliekal, L. J. Little, and D. Jones, “Computational Technology Approach to Math and Science Education,” IEEE Comp. in Science and Eng., 8 (3), 76 (2006)
H. Dag, et al., “Computational Science and Engineering Education at Istanbul Technical University,” IEEE Comp. in Science and Eng., 7 (1), (2005).
O. Yaşar, “CMST Pedagogical Approach to Math and Science Education,” Lecture Notes in Computer Science, Vol. 3045 (2004), pp. 807–816.
O. Yaşar and R. Landau, Elements of Computational Science and Engineering Education, SIAM Review, 45 (2003), pp. 787–805.
O. Yaşar, “Computational Science Education: Standards, Learning Outcomes and Assessment,” Lecture Notes in Computer Science, Vol. 2073 (2001), pp. 1159–1169.
O. Yaşar, K. Rajasethupathy, R. Tuzun, A. McCoy, and J. Harkin (2000). A New Perspective on Computational Science Education, IEEE J. Comp. in Science & Engineering, 5 (2), 2000.
L. J. Little, “The computational science major at SUNY Brockport”, FGCS 19, 1285-1292 (2003).

State University of New York faculty
American computer scientists
Living people
American academics of Turkish descent
Computational physicists
Year of birth missing (living people)